Time Doesn't Notice is No Address's first album. This is an Enhanced CD, which contains both regular audio tracks and multimedia computer files.

Track listing

Personnel
Ben Lauren: Vocals
Phil Moreton: Guitar, Background Vocals
Justin Long: Guitar
Bill Donaldson: Bass 
Randy Lane: Drums

2005 debut albums
Atlantic Records albums
Warner Music Group albums